Gene Healy (born November 16, 1970) is an American libertarian political pundit, journalist and editor. He serves as Vice President at the Cato Institute, as well as a contributing editor to Liberty magazine.

Education
Healy holds a B.A. from Georgetown University and a J.D. from the University of Chicago Law School.

Career
Healy is editor of the 2004 book Go Directly to Jail: The Criminalization of Almost Everything. He is the author of The Cult of the Presidency: America's Dangerous Devotion to Executive Power (2008) and False Idol: Barack Obama and the Continuing Cult of the Presidency (2012). His research interests include executive power and the role of the presidency, federalism, and over-criminalization.

He has appeared on PBS's Newshour and has been a guest on NPR's Talk of the Nation. His writing has been published in major newspapers including the Los Angeles Times, the New York Times, the Chicago Tribune, and the Legal Times. He writes a weekly column for the Washington Examiner.

Views
In 2011 Healy made the case that Ronald Reagan was neither a neoconservative nor a libertarian. In 2013 Healy argued that wanting restraint in foreign policy is not "isolationist" and even stated, "...'isolationism' has always been a smear word designed to shut off debate. It was coined in the late 19th century by Alfred Thayer Mahan, 'an ardent militarist, who used the term to slur opponents of American imperialism.'" In 2014 Healy criticized Hillary Clinton's interventionist foreign policy, saying, "I think when you look at the totality of her record, it's very concerning. And if she realizes her lifelong dream in 2016 to become commander-in-chief of the U.S. Armed Forces, she won't have to urge anyone to bomb. She'll be able to give those orders herself."

Bibliography
 Go Directly to Jail: The Criminalization of Almost Everything (editor) (2004) 
 The Cult of the Presidency: America's Dangerous Devotion to Executive Power (2008) 
 False Idol: Barack Obama and the Continuing Cult of the Presidency (2012)

References

External links
 Official website
 
 List of publications from the Cato Institute
 Gene Healy: Archives on LewRockwell.com

1970 births
Living people
21st-century American journalists
21st-century American male writers
21st-century American non-fiction writers
American book editors
American columnists
American libertarians
American male journalists
American male non-fiction writers
American political commentators
American political journalists
American political writers
Cato Institute people
Chicago Tribune people
Georgetown University alumni
Los Angeles Times people
The New York Times people
Non-interventionism
American opinion journalists
University of Chicago Law School alumni